The enzyme dolichylphosphate-mannose phosphodiesterase (EC 3.1.4.49) catalyzes the reaction

dolichyl β-D-mannosyl phosphate + H2O  dolichyl phosphate + D-mannose

This enzyme belongs to the family of hydrolases, specifically those acting on phosphoric diester bonds.  The systematic name is dolichyl-β-D-mannosyl-phosphate dolichylphosphohydrolase. This enzyme is also called mannosylphosphodolichol phosphodiesterase.

References

EC 3.1.4
Enzymes of unknown structure